Yacouba Sido (1910 in Maine Soroa, Niger – November 15, 1988 in Tanout) was a Nigerien politician who served in the French Senate from 1952-1958 .

References 
 page on the French Senate website

Nigerien politicians
French Senators of the Fourth Republic
1910 births
1988 deaths
Senators of French West Africa